Sphincterochila is a genus of air-breathing land snails, terrestrial pulmonate gastropod molluscs in the family Sphincterochilidae.

Sphincterochila is the type genus of the family Sphincterochilidae.

Species in the genus Sphincterochila are arid-adapted (adapted to living in very dry conditions).

Species 
Species in the genus Sphincterochila include:
 Sphincterochila baetica (Rossmässler, 1854)
 † Sphincterochila baumbergeri (Wenz, 1936)
 Sphincterochila candidissima (Draparnaud, 1801)
 Sphincterochila cariosa (Olivier, 1801) – shell description
 Sphincterochila cariosula (Michaud, 1833)
 Sphincterochila chionudiscus (Boettger, 1874)
 Sphincterochila cyrenaica Sturany, 1908
 Sphincterochila debeauxi elevata Pallary, 1910
 Sphincterochila fimbriata (Bourguignat, 1852)
 Sphincterochila illicita (Mousson, 1874)
 Sphincterochila insularis (Boettger, 1894)
 † Sphincterochila jodoti Rey, 1974
 Sphincterochila maroccana Pallary, 1917
 Sphincterochila maroccana conica Pallary, 1926
 Sphincterochila maroccana depressa Pallary, 1926
 Sphincterochila maroccana major Pallary, 1926
 Sphincterochila maroccana minor Pallary, 1926
 Sphincterochila maroccana tananensis Pallary, 1917
 Sphincterochila mixta Kaltenbach, 1950
 Sphincterochila pagodula (Rutland, 1878)
 Sphincterochila pagodula umbilicata (Ruttland, 1878)
 Sphincterochila pardoi Llabador, 1950
 Sphincterochila prophetarum (Bourguignat, 1852)
 Sphincterochila tunetana (Pfeiffer, 1850)
 Sphincterochila zonata (Bourguignat, 1853)

Synonyms
 Sphincterochila aharonii (Kobelt, 1913): synonym of Leucochroa aharonii Kobelt, 1913 (taxon inquirendum)
 Sphincterochila boissieri (Charpentier, 1847) – type species: synonym of Sphincterochila zonata zonata (Bourguignat, 1853)
 Sphincterochila corrugata Pallary, 1917: synonym of Albea mayrani var. corrugata Pallary, 1917 (taxon inquirendum)
 Sphincterochila debeauxi (Kobelt, 1881): synonym of Leucochroa debeauxi Kobelt, 1881 (taxon inquirendum)
 Sphincterochila marteli (Pallary, 1918): synonym of Albea marteli Pallary, 1918 (taxon inquirendum)
 Sphincterochila mayrani (Gassies, 1856): synonym of Albea mayrani (Gassies, 1856)  (taxon inquirendum)
 Sphincterochila mayrani turrita (Gassies, 1856)
 Sphincterochila roumensiana (Pallary, 1911): synonym of Albea roumensiana Pallary, 1918  (taxon inquirednum)

Comparison of apertural views of shells of five Sphincterochila species:

References

External links 
 .
 .
 .
 http://www.animalbase.uni-goettingen.de/zooweb/servlet/AnimalBase/home/genus?id=678

Sphincterochilidae
Gastropod genera
Taxa named by César Marie Félix Ancey